Robin Lee Rosenberg (born January 22, 1962) is a United States district judge of the United States District Court for the Southern District of Florida and former Florida Circuit Court Judge.

Biography

Rosenberg received a Bachelor of Arts degree in 1983 from Princeton University. She received a Master of Arts degree and Juris Doctor in 1989 from Duke University and Duke University School of Law. She began her legal career as a law clerk to Judge James C. Paine of the United States District Court for the Southern District of Florida from 1989 to 1990. She served as a Trial Attorney in the Civil Rights Division of the United States Department of Justice from 1990 to 1994. While on leave from that position, she worked at a non profit organization in the Czech Republic from 1993 to 1994. She was an associate at the law firm of Foley & Lardner from 1994 to 1995. She served as an Assistant City Attorney for the City of West Palm Beach, Florida, from 1995 to 1997. She was a partner at Holland & Knight LLP, from 1997 to 1999. She served as Vice President and General Counsel at the Slim Fast Foods Company from 1999 to 2001. She was a partner at the law firm of Rosenberg & McAuliffe, PL, from 2001 to 2006, and concurrently managed ARC Mediation, a full service dispute resolution firm, from 2002 to 2006. From 2007–2014, she was a Circuit Court Judge in the Fifteenth Judicial Circuit.

Federal judicial service

On February 26, 2014, President Barack Obama nominated Rosenberg to serve as a United States District Judge of the United States District Court for the Southern District of Florida, to the seat vacated by Judge Adalberto Jordan, who was elevated to the court of appeals on February 24, 2012. She received a hearing before the United States Senate Judiciary Committee on May 20, 2014. On June 19, 2014 her nomination was reported out of committee by a voice vote. On July 16, 2014, Senate Majority Leader Harry Reid filed a motion to invoke cloture on Rosenberg's nomination. The Senate invoked cloture on her nomination on July 22, 2014 by a 58–42 vote. Later that same day, Rosenberg was confirmed by a 100–0 vote.  She received her judicial commission on July 24, 2014.

Personal life
Rosenberg is married to former Florida State Attorney for Palm Beach County Michael McAuliffe.

See also
List of Jewish American jurists

References

External links

1962 births
Living people
Duke University School of Law alumni
Florida lawyers
Florida state court judges
Judges of the United States District Court for the Southern District of Florida
People from West Palm Beach, Florida
Phillips Academy alumni
Princeton University alumni
United States district court judges appointed by Barack Obama
21st-century American judges
20th-century American lawyers
21st-century American lawyers